Haitham Ahmed Zaki (4 April 1984 – 7 November 2019), also known as Haitham Zaki, was an Egyptian male actor who predominantly worked in Egyptian cinema.

Biography 
He was the son of veteran actors Ahmed Zaki and Hala Fouad. He died on 7 November 2019 in his apartment at the age of 35 due to sudden circulatory collapse.

Career 
He followed in his parents' footsteps and joined the film industry at the age of 22. He made his film acting debut in 2006 for the film Halim. He was roped in to fill the scenes and to play the male lead in the film Halim on behalf of his father Ahmed Zaki, who eventually died in 2005 during the shooting of the film. He also notably won the Best Egyptian Male Actor award for his performance in the 2011 film Dawaran Shobra.

Death
On 7 November 2019, he died in his apartment in Sheikh Zayed City at the age of 35 due to sudden circulatory collapse, a large amount of seawater was found near his body.

Filmography

Film 
 Halim (2006)
 Elbelyatsho 2007
 Kaf Alqamar 2011
 Dawaran Shobra (2011)
 Sukkar Mor (2015)
 The Treasure (2017)
 The Treasure 2 (2019)

 TV series 
 Al Sabaa Wasaya  (2014)
 Kalabsh (2018)
 Alamet Estefham'' (2019)

References

External links 
 
 

 
1984 births
2019 deaths
21st-century Egyptian male actors
Egyptian male film actors
Egyptian male television actors
Male actors from Cairo
Deaths from circulatory collapse